Pensión de mujeres  is a Mexican telenovela that aired on  Telesistema Mexicano in 1960. It was the original story and adaptation of Raúl Astor. It had 43 episodes starring Amparo Rivelles.

Cast 
 Amparo Rivelles
 Fanny Schiller
 Fernando Rey
 Mapita Cortés
 Prudencia Grifell
 Rosa Elena Durgel

Production 
Original story: Raúl Astor
Adaptation: Raúl Astor

References 

1960 telenovelas
Mexican telenovelas
Televisa telenovelas
Television shows set in Mexico
1960 Mexican television series debuts
1960 Mexican television series endings
Spanish-language telenovelas